c Ursae Majoris is the Bayer designation for a double-lined spectroscopic binary star system in the northern constellation of Ursa Major. It has an apparent visual magnitude of 5.18, which indicates that is visible to the naked eye. Parallax measurements yield an estimated distance of 66 light years from the Sun. The star is moving closer to the Earth with a heliocentric radial velocity of −14 km/s.

The spectroscopic binary nature of this system was among the first 75 such discovered by the Dominion Astrophysical Observatory in 1919. The pair orbit each other every 16.2 days with an eccentricity of 0.1.

The primary component has a stellar classification of G0 V, suggesting that it is a G-type main sequence star similar to ι Per. It has a mass of about 1.2 times the mass of the Sun, and 2.6 times the Sun's radius. The magnitude difference between the two components is estimated to be . The estimated properties of the secondary indicate that it is most likely a K-type main sequence star. The system displays no indication of chromospheric activity.

The system has been examined for evidence of an infrared excess that could indicate the presence of a circumstellar debris disk, but none has been found. At present, c UMa is moving in Earth's direction with a radial velocity of −14.3 km/s. Perihelion passage will occur in 1.3 million years when the system comes within  of the Sun. This is most likely a member of the Milky Way's thin disk population of stars.

References 

G-type main-sequence stars
Spectroscopic binaries
Ursa Major (constellation)
Ursae Majoris, c
3648
BD+62 1058
Ursae Majoris, 16
045333
079028